Tom Garfinkel is an American sports executive who is the vice chairman, president and CEO of the Miami Dolphins and Hard Rock Stadium and managing partner of the Formula One Miami Grand Prix. 

A graduate of the University of Colorado, Boulder and the University of Michigan's Ross School of Business, Garfinkel worked in sales, marketing, and branding roles with Miller Brewing Company and Texaco before entering sports. From 2001 to 2006 he oversaw business operations for Chip Ganassi Racing. He then served as executive vice president and chief operating officer of the Arizona Diamondbacks. In 2009 he joined the San Diego Padres as president and COO. In 2012 he was promoted to CEO. During his tenure with the Padres, Garfinkel created the Youth Baseball Initiative, which provided jerseys to over 850 Little League teams, helped broker a $1.2 billion television deal with Fox Sports San Diego, and was credited with raising the team's season-ticket base. In 2011 and 2012 the Padres had the top ticket sales and service team in baseball according to a survey in SportsBusiness Journal. He resigned from the Padres on July 9, 2013. On September 9, 2013, Garfinkel was named president and chief executive officer of the Miami Dolphins and Hard Rock Stadium, coincidentally replacing the man who succeeded him in San Diego, Mike Dee. Garfinkel also serves as managing partner of the Miami Grand Prix, a Formula One race that takes place around Hard Rock Stadium.

References

External links

Living people
Major League Baseball team presidents
Arizona Diamondbacks executives
University of Colorado Boulder alumni
Ross School of Business alumni
National Football League team presidents
Miami Dolphins executives
San Diego Padres executives
Year of birth missing (living people)
Auto racing executives